Cosmarium is a genus of freshwater organisms belonging to the Charophyta, a division of green algae from which the land plants (Embryophyta) emerged.

Description
In this large genus the cells are very variable. All are constricted in the middle leading to its bi-lobed appearance; the two halves are called semicells. Cells come in a variety of different shapes. The cell wall may be smooth or ornamented with spines, granules, scrobiculations (pits), or pores. Cells are generally flattened. Cells usually have one or two chloroplasts filling the cell; each chloroplast contains pyrenoids, typically one or two.

Identification
Species identification of Cosmarium depends on the shape of the cells and their ornamentation, and can be difficult. In addition, the genera Actinotaenium and Euastrum can be similar to various species of Cosmarium. Actinotaenium is generally circular in cross section, and Euastrum usually (but not always) has a notch at the tip of each semicell.

Taxonomy
Cosmarium is the largest genus of desmids, with over 1,000 species. It is an artificial genus: the defining characteristics of the genus are vague and arbitrary, and there are some species that are intermediate between several different genera. It is also not monophyletic, as molecular phylogenetic studies have shown that the form of Cosmarium evolved independently many times over. Despite this, the genus is still in use, because there is no known way of classifying desmids in line with their evolutionary history.

Habitat
Cosmarium and other desmid genera tend to prefer oligotrophic, somewhat acidic water habitats, but some species exist in more eutrophic and/or basic habitats. Some species, which are small and mostly plain, form a community known as a "Cosmarietum"; these may be further associated with a community of Closterium species forming a Cosmarietum-Closterietum association.

References

External links
 

Desmidiaceae
Charophyta genera